Margaret Court and Evonne Goolagong were the defending champions but only Goolagong competed that year with Virginia Wade.

Goolagong and Wade lost in the semifinals to Patricia Coleman and Karen Krantzcke.

Helen Gourlay and Kerry Harris won in the final 6–0, 6–4 against Coleman and Krantzcke.

Seeds
Champion seeds are indicated in bold text while text in italics indicates the round in which those seeds were eliminated. All four seeded teams received byes into the quarterfinals.

  Evonne Goolagong /  Virginia Wade (semifinals)
  Gail Chanfreau /  Olga Morozova (semifinals)
  Helen Gourlay /  Kerry Harris (champions)
  Patricia Coleman /  Karen Krantzcke (final)

Draw

External links
 1972 Australian Open – Women's draws and results at the International Tennis Federation

Women's Doubles
Australian Open (tennis) by year – Women's doubles
1972 in Australian women's sport
1972 in women's tennis
1971 in women's tennis
1971 in Australian women's sport